Paris Saint-Germain Féminine have won four titles. Domestically, the capital side have clinched one Division 1 championship, three French Cups and one Division 2 title. In international club football, Paris have reached the UEFA Champions League final twice (2015 and 2017). Additionally, PSG have won one unofficial title.

Influential officials and players in the club's history include most decorated president Nasser Al-Khelaifi, trophy-winning managers Sébastien Thierry, Camillo Vaz, Bernard Mendy, Olivier Echouafni and Didier Ollé-Nicolle, record appearance maker and longest-serving captain Sabrina Delannoy, and all-time top scorer Marie-Antoinette Katoto.

Honours

As of the end of the 2021–22 season.

Official

 
  shared record

Unofficial

 
  shared record

Competitive record

As of 18 March 2023.

Missing data from matches of the Ligue de Paris Île-de-France (1971–1979) and Division 2 (1993–94, 1996–97 and 1997–98 seasons).

Club

Matches

All-time record win: 19–0 (away to Bourges 18, Coupe de France, 8 January 2017).
All-time record defeat: 1–9 (away to Hénin-Beaumont, Division 1, 18 September 1994).
Record win in Division 1: 14–0 (away to Issy, 14 November 2020).
Record defeat in Division 1: 0–7 (home to Montpellier, 8 June 2008).
Record win in Coupe de France: 19–0 (away to Bourges 18, 8 January 2017).
Record defeat in Coupe de France: 0–7 (home to Paris FC, 5 May 2005).
Record win in UEFA Champions League: 9–0 (home to Olimpia Cluj, 14 October 2015).
Record defeat in UEFA Champions League: 0–7 (away to Lyon, 23 April 2016).
Highest home attendance (National Record): 43,254 (vs. Lyon at the Parc des Princes, UEFA Champions League, 30 April 2022).
First match at the Parc des Princes: home to Paris FC (1–0 win), Division 1, 18 October 2009.

Seasons

Most matches played in all competitions: 37 in 2016–17 and 2021–22.
Most goals scored in all competitions: 118 in 2021–22.
Most goals scored in Division 1: 88 in 2014–15.
Fewest goals conceded in all competitions: 11 in 1979–80, 1982–83 and 2000–01.
Fewest goals conceded in Division 1: 4 in 2020–21.
Most wins in all competitions: 28 in 2021–22.
Most wins in Division 1: 20 in 2014–15 and 2020–21.
Most points in Division 1: 62 in 2020–21.

Personnel

Presidents

Most decorated: 3 titles – Nasser Al-Khelaifi.
Longest-serving: 13 years, 4 months, 23 days – Francis Borelli.

Managers

Most decorated: 1 title – Olivier Echouafni, Camillo Vaz, Bernard Mendy, Didier Ollé-Nicolle and Sébastien Thierry.
Most matches managed: 126 matches – Farid Benstiti.
Most matches won: 97 wins – Farid Benstiti.
Highest win percentage: 80.00% – Didier Ollé-Nicolle.
Longest-serving: 5 years – Sébastien Thierry.

Players

Appearances

Most appearances in Division 1: 244 – Sabrina Delannoy.
Most appearances in Coupe de France: 45 – Sabrina Delannoy.
Most appearances in the UEFA Champions League: 32 – Sabrina Delannoy.

All-time most appearances

Statistics correct as of 18 March 2023. Bold denotes an active player for the club.

Goalscorers

Most goals in Division 1: 108 – Marie-Antoinette Katoto.
Most goals in Coupe de France: 35 – Marie-Laure Delie.
Most goals in the UEFA Champions League: 21 – Marie-Antoinette Katoto.
Most goals in a match: 7 – Nadia Nadim (vs. Issy, Division 1, 14 November 2020).

All-time top scorers

Statistics correct as of 12 March 2023. Bold denotes an active player for the club.

Captaincy

Longest-serving captain: 9 years – Sabrina Delannoy.

Captains

Award winners

The Best FIFA Football Awards

 The Best FIFA Goalkeeper (1)
 Christiane Endler in 2021.

UEFA Club Football Awards

UEFA Women's Champions League Defender of the Season (1)
 Irene Paredes – 2020–21.

Trophées UNFP du football

Division 1 Féminine Player of the Season (3)
 Élise Bussaglia in 2010–11.
 Kadidiatou Diani in 2020–21.
 Marie-Antoinette Katoto in 2021–22.

 Division 1 Féminine Goalkeeper of the Season (2)
 Christiane Endler (2) in 2018–19, 2020–21.

 Division 1 Féminine Young Player of the Season (4)
 Marie-Antoinette Katoto (2) in 2017–18, 2018–19.
 Sandy Baltimore in 2020–21.
 Laurina Fazer in 2021–22.

French Football Federation

Division 1 Féminine Player of the Season (4)
 Élise Bussaglia in 2010–11.
 Shirley Cruz in 2012–13.
 Kadidiatou Diani in 2020–21.
 Marie-Antoinette Katoto in 2021–22.

 Division 1 Féminine Goalkeeper of the Season (4)
 Katarzyna Kiedrzynek (2) in 2015–16, 2016–17.
 Christiane Endler (2) in 2018–19, 2020–21.
 Division 1 Féminine Young Player of the Season (4)
 Grace Geyoro in 2016–17.
 Marie-Antoinette Katoto (2) in 2017–18, 2018–19.
 Sandy Baltimore in 2020–21.
 Division 1 Féminine Manager of the Season (1)
 Olivier Echouafni in 2020–21.
 Division 1 Féminine Goal of the Season (1)
 Grace Geyoro in 2020–21.
 Division 1 Féminine Golden Boot (2)
 Marie-Antoinette Katoto (2) in 2018–19, 2019–20.

 Division 1 Féminine Assist Leader (1)
 Kadidiatou Diani in 2018–19.

References

External links

Official websites
PSG.FR - Site officiel du Paris Saint-Germain
Paris Saint-Germain (Women) - UEFA.com

Records and statistics
Paris Saint-Germain Féminine
Paris Saint-Germain Féminine records and statistics